Feshlaq Aghdash Hajji Saram (also Romanized as Feshlāq Āghdāsh Ḩājjī Sāram) is a village in Qeshlaq-e Sharqi Rural District, Qeshlaq Dasht District, Bileh Savar County, Ardabil Province, Iran. At the 2006 census, its population was 51, in 9 families.

References 

Towns and villages in Bileh Savar County